Łukasz Szukała (born 26 May 1984), is a Polish professional footballer who, among others, played as a centre back for the Poland national football team.

Club career

Universitatea Cluj
In June 2011, Szukała joined Universitatea Cluj on a three-year contract.

FCSB 

In August 2012, Łukasz signed with Romanian giants Steaua București.
On 4 November 2012, Szukała scored his first goal for title-chasing Steaua in a 3–1 win against their Bucharest arch-rivals, Dinamo, guaranteeing him a good relationship with the very demanding Steaua fans. In 2014, he was voted as the best foreign footballer in Liga I.

Ittihad FC
On 3 January 2015, he signed a contract with Al-Ittihad, when he entered his final six months of the deal with Steaua. The two clubs reached an agreement to release the player before his contract with Steaua ended, thus he joined Al-Ittihad in January 2015.

International career
Szukała made his first appearance for the Poland national football team against Denmark in 2013.

He scored his first goal for the national side in the 7–0 victory over Gibraltar.

Personal life 

Łukasz Szukała is a polyglot who speaks fluent Polish, English, French, German, and Romanian.

He also has a German citizenship. His parents emigrated to Germany during his early childhood. He grew up in the region of Trier.

Szukała is married to a sports news presenter from Romania, Raluca Hogyes, with whom he has a son (b. 2019).

Career statistics

Club

International goals

Honours
Steaua București
Liga I: 2012–13, 2013–14, 2014–15
Cupa României: 2014–15
Supercupa României: 2013
Cupa Ligii: 2014–15

Individual
Gazeta Sporturilor Foreign Player of the Year in Romania: 2014

References

External links

 Profile at Kicker.de
 
 
 

1984 births
Living people
Sportspeople from Gdańsk
Sportspeople from Trier
Polish emigrants to Germany
Naturalized citizens of Germany
Association football central defenders
Polish footballers
Poland under-21 international footballers
Poland international footballers
German footballers
FC Metz players
TSV 1860 Munich players
TSV 1860 Munich II players
Alemannia Aachen players
ACF Gloria Bistrița players
FC Universitatea Cluj players
FC Petrolul Ploiești players
FC Steaua București players
Ittihad FC players
Ankaraspor footballers
MKE Ankaragücü footballers
Regionalliga players
2. Bundesliga players
Liga I players
Saudi Professional League players
Süper Lig players
TFF First League players
Polish expatriate footballers
German expatriate footballers
Expatriate footballers in France
Expatriate footballers in Romania
Expatriate footballers in Saudi Arabia
Expatriate footballers in Turkey
Polish expatriate sportspeople in France
Polish expatriate sportspeople in Romania
Polish expatriate sportspeople in Saudi Arabia
Polish expatriate sportspeople in Turkey
German expatriate sportspeople in France
German expatriate sportspeople in Romania
German expatriate sportspeople in Saudi Arabia
German expatriate sportspeople in Turkey